= Graduate Talent Pool =

- Website: https://graduatetalentpoolsearch.direct.gov.uk/gtp/index

Graduate Talent Pool was a government-backed and funded service allowing graduates from the last three years to search for paid internships advertised by UK businesses.

The service, which launched in 2009, is provided by Graduate Prospects, on behalf of the UK government.
